The Dacia Dokker is a panel van and leisure activity vehicle (LAV) built at the Renault factory in Tangier, Morocco. It was officially launched at the 2012 Casablanca Auto Show, and initially went on sale in Morocco in June 2012. It has been available in Romania since September 2012, and is marketed in Europe, North Africa, Turkey, Israel and French overseas territories.

It is manufactured in passenger and panel van variants, as well as a crossover version, the Dokker Stepway, introduced at the 2012 Istanbul Motor Show, featuring body elements similar to the Sandero Stepway. It is marketed in the CIS countries and in the Middle East under the name Renault Dokker and Renault Kangoo in South America, but not in other parts of the world, as it would cannibalize the sales of its French sourced brother, the Renault Kangoo. In 2018, Dacia Italia together with Focaccia Group created a pick-up variant for the Italian market.

Markets

Argentina
A revised version is produced in Argentina as the Renault Kangoo, being launched commercially in 2018 as a first generation Renault Kangoo replacement, and the passenger version in May of the same year. It also arrived in the Mexican market in 2019. It is also exported to other Latin America markets such as Uruguay, Paraguay and Colombia.

As of 2015, the Kangoo contains about 40% Argentine parts.

Features

The name Dokker is a pun on the word dock worker and, according to Dacia, expresses the large transport capacity of the model and its modular interior and robustness.

It has one sliding side door, and can be optionally ordered with sliding doors on both sides.

Also, a second sliding side door is optional and has asymmetrical rear doors that can open at 90 or 180 degrees.

The car can also be ordered with a Media Nav system, which comes with navigation and audio functions, hands-free Bluetooth connectivity and USB and jack sockets. Other optional equipment offered are cruise control and rear parking sensors.

Engines

Safety
The Kangoo has front ventilated disc brakes.

It has ABS as standard, with electronic brakeforce distribution (EBD) and, optionally, can be equipped with electronic stability control (ESC). Standard equipment also includes airbags for driver and front passenger, as well as side airbags for head and chest.

The Kangoo in its most basic Latin American configuration with 2 airbags and ESC received 3 stars for adult occupants and 4 stars for toddlers from Latin NCAP in 2019.

References

External links
Official Dacia Dokker website

Dokker
Cars of Romania
Front-wheel-drive vehicles
2010s cars
Cars introduced in 2012
Vans
Latin NCAP small MPVs